La Historia del Divo (English: The History of the Divo) is a compilation album by Mexican singer Juan Gabriel release on April 4, 2006.

Track listing

Charts and certifications

Weekly charts

Year-end charts

Certifications

References

External links 
official website
 La Historia del Divo on buy.com
[] La Historia del Divo on allmusic.com

Juan Gabriel compilation albums
2006 compilation albums